Dadeus Grings (born 7 September 1936) is a Roman Catholic bishop who is the current ordinary of the archdiocese of Porto Alegre. He also serves as the chancellor of the Catholic University of Rio Grande do Sul.

Grings was ordained a priest on 23 December 1961. He was appointed bishop of São João da Boa Vista on 23 January 1991. He was appointed as Coadjutor Archbishop of Porto Alegre on 12 April 2000, and succeeded to the position of Archbishop on acceptance of the resignation of his predecessor, the late Archbishop Altamiro Rossato, C.Ss.R., on 7 February 2001. He was succeeded at some point in 2013 by Archbishop Jaime Spengler.

The Archbishop Emeritus is the author of 27 books.

Remarks on 4 May 2010

International controversy was stirred up in connection with remarks by Archbishop Emeritus Grings on 4 May 2010 when speaking of accusations of paedophilia against priests. He said that society as a whole is paedophile and that sexual abuse of children and adolescents is more common among doctors, teachers and businessmen than among priests. The problem, he said, is that today's society is paedophile, with the result that people easily fall into it, and the fact that it is being denounced is a good sign. In his view, all forms of sexuality were being banalized, and the acquisition of legal rights by homosexuals was likely to lead to recognition of the rights of paedophiles. Grings stated clearly that sexual abuse of children and adolescents is a crime and should be punished, but he admitted that, while the Church does adopt internal measures against the guilty, it finds it difficult to denounce its own members to the police. It is unjust, he said, to present paedophilia as a matter that concerns only the Church, when in Germany it had been found that only 0.2% of child abuse was committed by priests. He also said that homosexuality is innate in few cases and generally results from failure to overcome an adolescent experimental stage. A spokesman for the Bishops Conference distanced himself from the Archbishop's remark that society as a whole is paedophile, while English-language reports misinterpreted his admission that the Church finds it difficult to denounce priests to the police as if he had said that "internal punishment of priests guilty of abuse was sufficient and that police should not be involved".

References

1936 births
Living people
21st-century Roman Catholic archbishops in Brazil
20th-century Roman Catholic archbishops in Brazil
Roman Catholic bishops of Porto Alegre
Roman Catholic archbishops of Porto Alegre
Roman Catholic bishops of São João da Boa Vista